Jovana Micevska (born 26 July 2000) is a Macedonian female handballer for OGC Nice Côte d'Azur Handball and the North Macedonia national team.

She represented the North Macedonia at the 2022 European Women's Handball Championship.

References

External links

2000 births
Living people
People from Skopje
Expatriate handball players